O-2050 is a drug that is a classical cannabinoid derivative, which acts as an antagonist for the CB1 receptor. This gives it an advantage in research over many commonly used cannabinoid antagonists, such as rimonabant, which at higher doses act as inverse agonists at CB1 as well as showing off-target effects. However, while O-2050 acts as a silent antagonist in vitro, some tests in vivo have suggested it may show agonist activity under certain circumstances.

See also 
 O-2113

References 

Alkyne derivatives
Benzochromenes
Cannabinoids
CB1 receptor antagonists
Phenols
Sulfonamides